CSU may refer to:

 Channel service unit, a Wide area network equivalent of a network interface card
 Chari Aviation Services, Chad, by ICAO airline code
 Christian Social Union (UK), an Anglican social gospel organisation
 Christian Social Union in Bavaria, a political party in Bavaria, Germany
 Civil Service Union, a defunct trade union in the United Kingdom
 Constant speed unit, a mechanical device on an aircraft propeller that regulates engine speed by automatically changing pitch
 Crime Scene Unit, a forensic in some police groups this refers to crime scene investigators who respond to a crime scene
 Český statistický úřad, Czech Statistical Office

Universities and university systems
 Cagayan State University, Philippines
 California State University system, United States
 Caraga State University system, Philippines
 Cardinal Stritch University, Milwaukee, Wisconsin, United States
 Central South University, Changsha, Hunan, China
 Central State University, Ohio, United States
 Charles Sturt University, Australia
 Charleston Southern University Charleston, South Carolina, United States
 Chelyabinsk State University, Chelyabinsk, Russia
 Cheng Shiu University, Kaohsiung, Taiwan
 Chicago State University, Chicago, Illinois, United States
 Clayton State University, Georgia, United States
 Cleveland State University, Ohio, United States
 Colorado State University, Fort Collins, Colorado, United States
 Columbia Southern University, Alabama, United States
 Columbus State University, Georgia, United States
 Concordia Student Union, the organization representing undergraduate students at Concordia University in Montreal, Quebec, Canada
 Connecticut State University System, United States
 Coppin State University, Baltimore, Maryland, United States